The National Housing Act of 1934, also called the Better Housing Program, was part of the New Deal passed during the Great Depression in order to make housing and home mortgages more affordable. It created the Federal Housing Administration (FHA) and the Federal Savings and Loan Insurance Corporation (FSLIC).

The Act was designed to stop the tide of bank foreclosures on family homes during the Great Depression. Both the FHA and the FSLIC worked to create the backbone of the mortgage and home building industries, until the 1980s. 

These policies had disparate impacts on Americans along segregated lines :Author Richard Rothstein says the housing programs begun under the New Deal were tantamount to a "state-sponsored system of segregation."

The government's efforts were "primarily designed to provide housing to white, middle-class, lower-middle-class families," he says. African-Americans and other people of color were left out of the new suburban communities — and pushed instead into urban housing projects.

The Housing Act of 1937 built on this legislation.

References

External links
Public Law 73-479, 73d Congress, H.R. 9620, National Housing Act of 1934

1934 in law
73rd United States Congress
New Deal legislation
Public housing in the United States
United States federal housing legislation
Mortgage legislation
Redlining
June 1934 events